Dan Levy is a Canadian actor, writer, director, and comedian. 

He co-created, wrote and starred in the sitcom Schitt's Creek (2015-2020), and hosted Saturday Night Live in 2021.

In 2020 he received the Human Rights Campaign Visibility Award. He also received six Primetime Emmy Award nominations winning for Outstanding Comedy Series, Outstanding Directing for a Comedy Series, Outstanding Writing for a Comedy Series and Outstanding Supporting Actor in a Comedy Series for Schitt's Creek. He also received the Screen Actors Guild Award for Outstanding Performance by an Ensemble in a Comedy Series and the Golden Globe Award for Best Television Series – Musical or Comedy.

Major associations

Emmy Awards

Golden Globe Awards

Screen Actors Guild Awards

Canadian awards

ACTRA Awards

Canadian Screen Awards

Miscellaneous awards

References

External links

Lists of awards received by American actor